Bruno Fornaroli Mezza (born 7 September 1987) is a professional footballer who plays as a forward or attacking midfielder for Melbourne Victory. Born in Uruguay, he plays for the Australian national team.

Club career
Fornaroli was born in Salto, Uruguay.

Sampdoria
On 22 July 2008, Fornaroli, who has Italian ancestry, moved to Italian Serie A side UC Sampdoria for a €3 million transfer fee, signing a five-year contract worth €300,000 per year. He made his Serie A debut on 14 September 2008, coming on for Paolo Sammarco in the 75th minute in a 2–0 defeat to Lazio at the Stadio Olimpico. He then scored in both legs of Sampdoria's UEFA Cup matches against FBK Kaunas. He made five Serie A appearances by January 2009, without scoring a goal.

Loans to San Lorenzo, Recreativo Huelva, Nacional
In February 2009, he moved on loan to Argentine Primera División side San Lorenzo de Almagro. At San Lorenzo, Fornaroli scored twice in 15 appearances. In August 2009, Fornaroli was loaned to Spanish Segunda División side Recreativo Huelva. At Recreativo, he scored two league goals in 17 appearances. Fornaroli returned to Sampdoria for the 2010–11 season, but after playing just three minutes for the first team in the first half of the season, Fornaroli was loaned back to Club Nacional de Football in January 2011. During his loan spell, Fornaroli scored four times in 13 appearances.

Return to Sampdoria
After Sampdoria's relegation to Serie B, Fornaroli was given another chance in the first team at the club. However, he failed to score in 11 appearances in the 2011–12 Serie B season.

Panathinaikos
On 21 July 2012, Fornaroli signed a three-year contract with Panathinaikos F.C. after manager Jesualdo Ferreira requested to have him in his team. He made 20 league and 7 continental appearances for the Greek club without scoring a goal. On 2 September 2013, he terminated his contract with Panathinaikos.

Danubio
Fornaroli then joined Uruguayan side Danubio in January 2014. On 8 July 2015, Danubio confirmed that he would leave the club and continue his career at Melbourne City.

Melbourne City

2015–16 season

On 10 August 2015, Melbourne City confirmed that they had signed Fornaroli on a two-year deal. He scored his first goal for Melbourne City on his debut on 26 August 2015 against Wellington Phoenix in an FFA Cup match. In the following round of the FFA Cup, the quarterfinals he scored two goals against Heidelberg United. Fornaroli scored his first A-League goal in a 3–2 defeat to rivals Melbourne Victory. The following week Fornaroli scored a brace in City's 3–1 victory over the Central Coast Mariners. He continued his rich scoring form with a brace against Adelaide United making him the top scorer of the league by round 5. Fornaroli also became the quickest A-League player to score 11 goals in the league. On 5 March 2016, Fornaroli notched a hat-trick against Sydney FC at AAMI Park to become the first A-League player to score 20 goals in a regular season. Melburnians, a City supporters group, honoured Fornaroli with a dedicated display, reading "El Tuna 23 Rey de Melbourne", at City's next home game on 18 March 2016. Fornaroli capped the season by winning the A-League Golden Boot after scoring 23 goals in the regular season (5 ahead of his nearest challenger), and was the joint winner of Melbourne City's Player of the Year award.

2016–17 season

On 8 August 2016, City confirmed Fornaroli had signed a new three-year deal, with the striker being elevated to marquee player status. On 25 September 2016, Fornaroli was announced as Melbourne City's captain, taking over from retired Patrick Kisnorbo. After scoring two goals against Newcastle Jets in Round 6, Fornaroli became the fastest player to score 30 goals in the A-League. Fornaroli finished the A-League season with 17 goals in 27 games.

In the 2016 FFA Cup Final, City defeated Sydney FC 1–0 and achieved its first senior men's trophy as a club. Fornaroli was given the Mark Viduka man of the match award. In his victory speech, he uttered an expletive which saw him earn a reprimand from the Football Federation Australia.

2017–18 season
In August 2017, Fornaroli suffered a broken ankle in an FFA Cup match against Hakoah Sydney City East FC. The injury, and a subsequent setback, meant that Fornaroli had to wait until Round 20 before he could play his first match of the 2017–18 A-League season. Fornaroli was quick to return to form, scoring in five of the last six matches of the home and away season.

2018–19 season
Fornaroli started the 2018-19 season in fine fashion, scoring a late extra-time winner against Brisbane Roar FC in Round 32 of the 2018 FFA Cup.

On 26 February 2019, Fornaroli and Melbourne City mutually agreed to terminate his contract following a falling out with the club manager Warren Joyce. Fornaroli subsequently spent a large portion of the 2018–19 season on the sidelines.

Perth Glory

2019–20 season
In March 2019, Fornaroli signed a two-year deal with Perth Glory. On 27 October he scored his first A-League goal for the team versus Wellington Phoenix. On 23 November he scored his 50th goal on his 76th appearance in the A-League.

2021–22 season
Fornaroli scored 7 goals in 14 appearances in all competitions, representing 40% of Perth Glory's goals during the season.

2022–23 season
On 28 October 2022, it was announced that Fornaroli was leaving Perth Glory by mutual consent, due to an alleged contract dispute.

Melbourne Victory
On 31 October 2022, Fornaroli signed with Melbourne Victory. He became the 14th player to cross the divide having played 70 games and scoring 48 goals for Melbourne City. Fornaroli made his debut the week of signing for Victory, coming on as a substitute and scoring a penalty on his debut.

International career
Fornaroli was a member of the Uruguay team at the 2003 South American U-17 Championship in Bolivia. He scored in Uruguay's group match against Venezuela.

In March 2022, it was revealed that Fornaroli was selected to play for Australia after becoming eligible due to a change in the FIFA eligibility rules in 2020 that allows residents of countries there under visas to play for their country of residence. He made his debut for Australia as a substitute in a World Cup qualifying game against Japan.

Career statistics

Club

International

Honours
Nacional
 Uruguayan Primera División: 2010–11

Danubio
 Uruguayan Primera División: 2013–14

Melbourne City
 FFA Cup: 2016

Individual
 Melbourne City Player of the Year: 2015–16
 PFA A-League Team of the Season: 2015–16
 A-League Golden Boot: 2015–16
 Mark Viduka Medal: 2016

Records
 Quickest to reach 30 goals in the A-league

References

External links
 
  
 Argentine Primera Statistics at Fútbol XXI 

1987 births
Living people
Footballers from Salto, Uruguay
Australian soccer players
Australia international soccer players
Uruguayan footballers
Uruguay youth international footballers
Australian people of Uruguayan descent
Sportspeople of Uruguayan descent
Australian people of Italian descent
Uruguayan people of Italian descent
Uruguayan emigrants to Australia
Uruguayan expatriate footballers
Association football forwards
Naturalised soccer players of Australia
Club Nacional de Football players
U.C. Sampdoria players
San Lorenzo de Almagro footballers
Recreativo de Huelva players
Panathinaikos F.C. players
Danubio F.C. players
Figueirense FC players
Melbourne City FC players
Perth Glory FC players
Melbourne Victory FC players
Uruguayan Primera División players
Argentine Primera División players
Serie A players
Serie B players
Super League Greece players
Campeonato Brasileiro Série A players
A-League Men players
Expatriate footballers in Italy
Expatriate footballers in Spain
Expatriate footballers in Argentina
Expatriate footballers in Paraguay
Expatriate footballers in Greece
Expatriate footballers in Brazil
Expatriate soccer players in Australia
Uruguayan expatriate sportspeople in Italy
Uruguayan expatriate sportspeople in Spain
Uruguayan expatriate sportspeople in Argentina
Uruguayan expatriate sportspeople in Paraguay
Uruguayan expatriate sportspeople in Greece
Uruguayan expatriate sportspeople in Brazil
Uruguayan expatriate sportspeople in Australia
Marquee players (A-League Men)